Deh Now-e Yek or Dehnow-e Yek may refer to:
 Deh Now-e Yek, Bam
 Deh Now-e Yek, Bardsir
 Dehnow-e Yek, Jiroft
 Dehnow-e Yek, Sirjan